Kuchipudi is a village in Krishna district of the Indian state of Andhra Pradesh. It is also known as Kuchelapuram or Kuchilapuri. It is the origin of the eponymous dance form Kuchipudi, one of the eight major Indian classical dances. It is one of the villages in the Movva mandal to be a part of Andhra Pradesh Capital Region.

Geography
This place is the border of Krishna district and Guntur district. Kollur is towards west of the village. It is located in Movva mandal of Machilipatnam revenue division.

Education
Sri Siddhendra Yogi Kala Pitham in the village is one of the eight schools under Potti Sreeramulu Telugu University, renowned for the dance form of Kuchipudi.

History
Siddhendra Yogi Kala Peetham, one of the eight schools of Potti Sreeramulu Telugu University is situated in Kuchipudi. The Kuchipudi dance was evolved by Siddhendra Yogi.

Transport

See also
Villages in Movva mandal

References

Villages in Krishna district